A leadership election was held by the United Malays National Organisation (UMNO) party on 25 June 1972. It was won by incumbent Prime Minister and acting President of UMNO, Abdul Razak Hussein.

Supreme Council election results
[ Source]

Permanent Chairman

Deputy Permanent Chairman

President

Deputy President

Vice Presidents

Supreme Council Members

See also
1974 Malaysian general election
First Razak cabinet

References

1972 elections in Malaysia
United Malays National Organisation leadership election
United Malays National Organisation leadership elections